The Americas Zone was one of the three zones of the regional Davis Cup competition in 1998.

In the Americas Zone there were four different tiers, called groups, in which teams competed against each other to advance to the upper tier. The top two teams in Group III advanced to the Americas Zone Group II in 1999, whereas the bottom two teams were relegated to the Americas Zone Group IV in 1999.

Participating nations

Draw
 Venue: Santa Cruz Tennis Club, Santa Cruz de la Sierra, Bolivia
 Date: 29 April–3 May

Group A

Group B

1st to 4th place play-offs

5th to 8th place play-offs

Final standings

  and  promoted to Group II in 1999.
  and  relegated to Group IV in 1999.

Round robin

Group A

Bolivia vs. Antigua and Barbuda

Costa Rica vs. Puerto Rico

Bolivia vs. Costa Rica

Antigua and Barbuda vs. Puerto Rico

Bolivia vs. Puerto Rico

Antigua and Barbuda vs. Costa Rica

Group B

Bermuda vs. El Salvador

Dominican Republic vs. Panama

Bermuda vs. Dominican Republic

El Salvador vs. Panama

Bermuda vs. Panama

Dominican Republic vs. El Salvador

1st to 4th place play-offs

Semifinals

Costa Rica vs. El Salvador

Dominican Republic vs. Bolivia

Final

Dominican Republic vs. Costa Rica

3rd to 4th play-off

El Salvador vs. Bolivia

5th to 8th place play-offs

5th to 8th play-offs

Panama vs. Puerto Rico

Antigua and Barbuda vs. Bermuda

5th to 6th play-off

Panama vs. Antigua and Barbuda

7th to 8th play-off

Puerto Rico vs. Bermuda

References

External links
Davis Cup official website

Davis Cup Americas Zone
Americas Zone Group III